The Jeonnam Line (全南線, Zen'nan-sen) was a railway line of the Chōsen Railway (Chōtetsu) of colonial-era Korea, located in South Jeolla Province.

History
On 13 July 1918, the privately owned Chōsen Southern Railway was granted a concession to build a railway line from Songjeongni (now Gwangju Songjeong) to Masan via Damyang and Jinju. Work on the Songjeongni–Damyang section began in April 1921, and was opened to traffic on 1 July 1922 as the Jeonnam Line; the month prior, work had begun on the Masan–Jinju section, which was later opened as the Gyeongnam Line. On 1 September 1923, the Chōsen Southern Railway merged with five other privately owned railways to create the Chōsen Railway. Work to build the Damyang–Jinju section was never completed, and on 31 October 1944, the Gwangju–Damyang section was dismantled. After the end of the Pacific War and the nationalisation of Korea's railways, the Korean National Railroad divided the Jeonnam Line, making the Gwangju–Seongjeongni section part of the Gwangju Line, and after completing the Songjeong–Jinju section, merging that into the Gyeongjeon Line.

Route

References

Rail transport in South Korea
Rail transport in Korea
Korea under Japanese rule
Defunct railway companies of Japan
Defunct railway companies of Korea
Chosen Railway